Queen's College (QC) is a coeducational institution located in Nassau, Bahamas, operating under the auspices of the Bahamas Conference of the Methodist Church. Founded in 1890, Queen's College is the oldest private school in the Bahamas.

Structure 

Queen's College consists of three sections: the early learning centre, a primary school and a high school. The school offers Advanced Placement courses, A+ certification, Advanced Subsidiary courses, SAT II course, and MOUS (Microsoft Office User Specialist Certification) certificates.

History 

In 1871, Queen's College opened its doors under the name The Bahamas Wesleyan Propriety Institution. The school's first principal was George Terry. From 1890 to 1925, the school continued under the guidance of S. B. Wilson and his successors, including Rev. Leonard Edge (1903–1908). 

In 1925, Rev Richard P. Dyer took up the appointment as headmaster, a position he which held until 1959. Dyer was succeeded by Geoffrey Litherland (1959–64), Neville Stewart (1964–71), and Hayden Middleton (1971–79).

By the late 1960s, the school's population had grown to more than 2,000 students. The first Bahamian administrator of Queen's College, Yvonne Noronha, was appointed vice principal of the college and headmistress of the primary school in 1978. This was followed by the appointment of Charles Sweeting in 1979. Sweeting served as principal until 1993. 

Vice Principal Philip Cash was appointed principal in 1993 and served until he died in June 1997. In November 1997, Andrea Gibson became the first woman principal and served until 2019. Virginia Minnis was appointed head of the early learning centre in September 1999 and was the first Bahamian to serve in this post.

The school's current principal is Rev Henry Knowles, who has held the position since 2019.

Sports 

The Comets, the school sporting team, has won awards in basketball, volleyball, swimming, track & field, and soccer. For years, Queen's College has placed second in the Bahamas Association of Independent Secondary Schools (BAISS) Track and Field Championship. In 2015, the Comets secured their first victory over the St. Augustine's College (SAC) Big Red Machines, who were on a 20+ year winning streak.

Administration 
As of 2014:

Principal: Ms. Andrea Gibson 
Early Learning Centre Administration: Mrs. Virginia Minnis, Head of Section
Primary School Administration: Sylvia Beneby, Vice Principal, Head of Primary School, Angela Culmer, Deputy Head 
Primary School Curriculum Coordinator: Alexia Tsavoussis
Early Years Curriculum Coordinator: Antja Humes
High School Administration: Shawn Turnquest, Vice Principal – Head of High School

House system

Queen's College has four houses: Dyer, Heath, King, and Rogers. This system is used primarily for student classification in sporting events and as a merit system up to the high school level. It is then used to place students into home room classes, where students remain until graduation. It is also used to decide which students go to BAISS.

Extra-curricular activities 
Clubs and societies include but is not limited to:

 The SPARC (Students Pursuing Advanced Rigorous Courses) Programme 
 The Student Christian Movement
 The Student Representative Council
 The Anchor Club
 The Key Club
 The Junior Cooperative Credit Union
 The Interact Club
 The Debating Society (encompassing The Model United Nations debate)
 The People to People International Student Chapter
 The Teacher Cadets Club
 The Modern Languages Club
 The Governor General's Youth Awards
 The Queen in Me Club
 The Drama Club
 The Chess Club
 The Guitar Club
 Feeding the 5000
 Cheerleading
 Band
 French Praise Team
 School Choir
 Junkanoo Squad

Through Queen's College's extra-curricular involvement, students have become involved with organizations such as Resources and Education for Autism and Related Challenges (REACH), the AIDS Foundation of the Bahamas, and the Special Olympics Committee of the Bahamas.

Students of the college have volunteered in improving the living conditions and recognition of hurricane victims.

Notable alumni
Durward Knowles, Olympic sailor
Sir Leonard Knowles, first Chief Justice of The Bahamas
Keva Eldon Bethel, educator
Mychal Thompson, NBA basketball player
Jackie Edwards, long jumper
Allison Martlew, musician
Culture, rapper/musician
Hon. Obie Wilchcombe, Member of Parliament, West End & Bimini
Hon. Glenys Hanna Martin, Member of Parliament, Englerston & Chairwoman, Progressive Liberal Party
Sen. Hon. Henry Alexander L. Storr, Senator, & Deputy chairman, Progressive Liberal Party

References

External links

 
 QC Alumni & Friends website
 QC PTA website

Schools in the Bahamas
Methodist schools in the Caribbean
Educational institutions established in 1890
Nassau, Bahamas
1890 establishments in the British Empire